Mebege is the supreme god of the Fang people of the Central African Republic. He was a creator god and was originally alone in the universe with a spider, Dibobia, as his only company.

Legend 
Mebege created the earth on the suggestion of Dibobia. He gave several strands of his hair, a part of his brain, and a smooth stone and turned them into an egg. Then, Dibobia put the egg into the sea. After some time, the egg cracked open and three deities came out, and the firstborn, Zame ye Mebege, became the leader of the pantheon. He was also associated with masculine energy and the sun. Nyingwan Mebege was the secondborn, the sister of Zame ye Mebege, and was associated with fertility, feminine energy, and the moon. Nlona Mebege was the youngest, the brother of Zame ye Mebege, and associated with evil. Mebege gave Zame instructions on how to create the earth and once he succeeded, Mebege and Dibobia left Zame in charge of the earth, while they both ascended to the heavens.

See also 

 List of African mythological figures

References 

African gods
African mythology
Creator gods